Hutchesons' Grammar School is an independent day school for boys and girls aged 3–18 in Glasgow, Scotland. It was founded as Hutchesons' Boys' Grammar School by George Hutcheson and Thomas Hutcheson in 1641. Prospective pupils must sit an entrance test and interview to gain admission. The Boys' and Girls' schools amalgamated in 1976, at the grounds where the Boys' school had moved to almost two decades prior to form the current senior school. The Girls' school campus became the junior school and in 1994, a new pre-school block at the junior school was constructed. The school now has around 1,300 pupils across its Pre-school, Junior and Senior Schools.

In 2019, the school had the second-highest exam results in Scotland.

The School is governed by Hutchesons' Educational Trust. The Rector is Colin Gambles.

History

The School was founded in 1641 by brothers Thomas and George Hutcheson.

In 2001, the school expanded into Glasgow's West End when it merged with Laurel Park School and created a nursery and primary school on Lilybank Terrace, although this has since closed.  The building suffered heavy damage in a fire in November 2008, and again in early 2019.

In 2021, the schools purchased a new sports complex in Pollok Country Park, previously owned by Craigholme School. Consisting of a games hall with rock climbing walls, a dance studio, an astro turf pitch (primarily used for hockey, but additionally used as tennis courts in the summer term), grounds for an additional rugby field and space for a new outdoor learning area. The Campus is known widely throughout the school as 'H@PP', an abbreviation for Hutchesons' at Pollok Park.

In 2022, the school obtained new playing fields also inside Pollok Country Park. The schools decided to acquire these fields as they are near to the school's other sports grounds.

Affiliations

Hutchesons' is a member of many Associations that represent Independent Schools throughout the United Kingdom, these include, The Headmasters' and Headmistresses' Conference (HMC) a organisation founded in 1869 which represents a select few independent schools and Hutchesons' is amoung only 23 school in Scotland represented by the HMC, other affiliations in which the school is represented include: The Independent Schools Council (ISC) and The Scottish Council of Independent Schools (SCIS)

Houses
Pupils at the school are divided into one the following four Houses:

 Montrose 
 Stuart 
 Lochiel 
 Argyll 

Each House has a team of four staff; Head of House and 3 Assistant Heads of House and this team is overseen by a Depute Rector. Each House has one Assistant responsible for the Learning Support needs of pupils within the House, providing a link between the pastoral provision and the Learning Support department.

The House Staff work closely with form teachers and the Matron and are overseen by the Depute Rector (Pastoral). The Pastoral Care staff hold a Mental Health First Aid qualification. In addition, each House has senior pupil Mental Health Ambassadors supporting the House Staff.

School Tartan

The school tartan derives from the Hutcheson tartan with the colours changed to fit the school colours. It was adapted by Colin Hutcheson, a Governor of the Scottish Tartans Authority, and launched in March 2005.

The Tartan is worn on Founders Day every year as a Kilt by the Head boy and Depute Head boy, as a skirt by the Head girl and Depute head girl and as a tie by the rector. Founders day service is held annually at Glasgow Cathedral on the 19th of March. The tartan can also be found on the school scarf, which is worn with the winter uniform.

Awards

In November 2011, Hutchesons' Grammar School was named the 'Scottish Independent Secondary school of the year'.

In December 2022, Hutchesons' Senior School was in the top 5 Independent Secondary Schools in Scotland.

In 2023, The schools Pipe band made their debut at the Scottish Schools Pipe Band championships and won 1st place in their category.

Notable alumni

Former pupils of Hutchesons' are known as Old Hutchesonians

 Madge Easton Anderson – first female professional lawyer in Britain
 Kevin Sneader – global managing partner CEO of McKinsey
Ian McColl, Baron McColl of Dulwich  - Conservative member of the House of Lords
Kenny McBain – TV director and producer. Responsible for Inspector Morse TV series
 Gareth Kirkwood  – cricketer and business executive
 Alix Jamieson – Olympic athlete
Alan Bulloch – former Scottish rugby union player
Ailsa Carmichael, Lady Carmichael - Judge
 John Buchan  – novelist, historian and Governor-General of Canada
 O. Douglas (Anna Buchan) – novelist
 Lionel Charles Knights – King Edward VII Professor of English Literature, University of Cambridge, 1965–73 
 Nan Dunbar – fellow and tutor in classics at Somerville College, Oxford
Craig McKnight – cricketer
Alison Di Rollo  – Solicitor General for Scotland
 Archibald Leitch – architect 
 James Maxton – MP and leader of the Independent Labour Party
 Derry Irvine (Baron Irvine of Lairg)  – barrister, QC and former Lord Chancellor
 Carol Smillie – TV presenter and former model
 Ken Bruce – BBC Radio 2 DJ
 Adair Turner (Lord Turner of Ecchinswell) – chair of the Financial Services Authority
 John Mason – Scottish National Party MSP
 Daniel Lamont – Moderator of the General Assembly of the Church of Scotland from 1936 to 1937
 Leon Smith  – British Davis Cup captain
 Cordelia Oliver – journalist, painter and art critic
 J David Simons – novelist
 John Barbour – footballer and soldier killed in World War I
 Hugh Wyllie – former Moderator of the General Assembly of the Church of Scotland
Anas Sarwar- Leader of the Scottish Labour Party, Labour list MSP, former Westminster MP
Humza Yousaf – SNP MSP, youngest MSP and first ethnic minority cabinet member in Scottish government
Myra MacDonald – journalist and author

Notable Staff

Graham Dunlop - Head of Stuart House

References

External links
 Hutchesons' Website
 Hutchesons' Grammar School page on Scottish Schools Online
 "Statues of the Hutcheson Brothers" Glasgow – City of Sculpture By Gary Nisbet

1641 establishments in Scotland
Educational institutions established in the 1640s
Grammar schools in Scotland
Private schools in Glasgow
Member schools of the Headmasters' and Headmistresses' Conference
Pollokshields